Japalura kumaonensis (common names: Kumaon mountain lizard, Kumaon forest agama) is an agamid lizard found in northern India, Pakistan, Nepal, and Tibet (China). It was described based on specimens from Mussoorie and from Nainital in the Kumaon division, the latter reflected in the specific name kumaonensis.

References

Japalura
Reptiles described in 1907
Taxa named by Nelson Annandale
Reptiles of China
Reptiles of India
Reptiles of Nepal
Reptiles of Pakistan
Fauna of Tibet